George Joseph Stigler (January 17, 1911 – December 1, 1991) was an American economist. He was the 1982 laureate in Nobel Memorial Prize in Economic Sciences and is considered a key leader of the Chicago school of economics.

Early life and education 
Stigler was born in Seattle, Washington, the son of Elsie Elizabeth (Hungler) and Joseph Stigler. He was of German descent (and Hungarian on his mother's side) and spoke German in his childhood. He graduated from the University of Washington in 1931 with a BA and then spent a year at Northwestern University, from which he obtained his MBA in 1932. It was during his studies at Northwestern that Stigler developed an interest in economics and decided on an academic career.

Career 
After he received a tuition scholarship from the University of Chicago, Stigler enrolled there in 1933 to study economics and went on to earn his PhD in economics there in 1938. He taught at Iowa State College from 1936 to 1938. He spent much of World War II at Columbia University, performing mathematical and statistical research for the Manhattan Project. He then spent one year at Brown University. He served on the Columbia faculty from 1947 to 1958.

At Chicago, he was greatly influenced by Frank Knight, his dissertation supervisor. Milton Friedman, a friend for over 60 years, commented that it was remarkable for Stigler to have passed his dissertation under Knight, as only three or four students had ever managed to do so in Knight's 28 years at Chicago. Stigler's influences included Jacob Viner and Henry Simons as well as students W. Allen Wallis and Friedman.

Stigler is best known for developing the Economic Theory of Regulation (1971), also known as capture, which says that interest groups and other political participants will use the regulatory and coercive powers of government to shape laws and regulations in a way that is beneficial to them. This theory is a component of the public choice field of economics but is also deeply opposed by public choice scholars belonging to the "Virginia School," such as Charles Rowley. He also carried out extensive research in the history of economic thought.

Stigler's most important contribution to economics was published in his landmark 1961 article, "The Economics of Information." According to Friedman, Stigler "essentially created a new area of study for economists." Stigler stressed the importance of information: "One should hardly have to tell academicians that information is a valuable resource: knowledge is power. And yet it occupies a slum dwelling in the town of economics."

His 1962 article "Information in the Labor Market" developed the theory of search unemployment.

In 1963 he was elected as a Fellow of the American Statistical Association.

He was known for his sharp sense of humor, and he wrote a number of spoof essays. In his book The Intellectual and the Marketplace, for instance, he proposed Stigler's Law of Demand and Supply Elasticities: "all demand curves are inelastic and all supply curves are inelastic too." The essay referenced studies that found many goods and services to be inelastic over the long run and offered a supposed theoretical proof; he ended by announcing that his next essay would demonstrate that the price system does not exist.

Another essay, "A Sketch on the Truth in Teaching," described the consequences of a (fictional) set of court decisions that held universities legally responsible for the consequences of teaching errors. The Stigler diet is also named after him.

Stigler wrote numerous articles on the history of economics, published in the leading journals and republished 14 of them in 1965. The American Economic Review said, "many of these essays have become such well-known landmarks that no scholar in this field should be unfamiliar with them... The lucid prose, penetrating logic, and wry humor... have become the author's trademarks."

Stigler was a founding member of the Mont Pelerin Society and was its president from 1976 to 1978. He was a libertarian/classical liberal.

Stigler was elected to the American Philosophical Society in 1955, the American Academy of Arts and Sciences in 1959, and the United States National Academy of Sciences in 1975. He received the National Medal of Science in 1987.

Bibliography 
 (1939). "Production and Distribution in the Long Run," Journal of Political Economy, 47(3),  pp. 305–327 (arrow-scrollable).
 ([1941] 1994). Production and Distribution Theories: The Formative Period. New York: Macmillan. & Description arrow-scrollable preview.
 (1945). "The Cost of Subsistence," Journal of Farm Economics, 2, pp. 303–314. Arrow-scrollable.
 (1961). "The Economics of Information," Journal of Political Economy, 69(3), pp. 213–225.
 (1962a). "Information in the Labor Market." Journal of Political Economy, 70(5), Part 2, pp. 94–105.
 (1962b). The Intellectual and the Marketplace. Selected Papers, no. 3. Chicago: University of Chicago Graduate School of Business. Reprinted in Sigler (1986), pp. 79–88
 (1962c). (With Claire Friedland) "What Can Regulators Regulate," Journal of Law and Economics, pp. 3–21.
 (1963). (With Paul Samuelson) "A Dialogue on the Proper Economic Role of the State." Selected Papers, no. 7. pp. 3–20. Chicago: University of Chicago Graduate School of Business
 (1963). Capital and Rates of Return in Manufacturing Industries. National Bureau of Economic Research, Princeton, NJ: Princeton University Press
 (1965). 
 (1968).  The Organization of Industry. Description & arrow-scrollable preview. Homewood, IL: Richard D. Irwin
 (1970). (With J.K. Kindahl) The Behavior of Industrial Prices. National Bureau of Economic Research, New York: Columbia University Press
 (1971). "The Theory of Economic Regulation." Bell Journal of Economics and Management Science, no. 3, pp. 3–18 (arrow-scrollable).
  (1972).  "The Adoption of Marginal Utility Theory," History of Political Economy, 4(2), pp. 571–586. Also below at * (1982b).
 (1975). Citizen and the State: Essays on Regulation
 (1982a).  "The Process and Progress of Economics," Nobel Memorial Lecture, 8 December (with bibliography)
 (1982b). The Economist as Preacher, and Other Essays. Chicago: University of Chicago Press
 (1983).  The Organization of Industry
 (1985).   autobiography
 (1986). The Essence of Stigler, K.R. Leube and T.G. Moore, ed. Arrow-scroll to respective essays. 
 (1987). The Theory of Price, Fourth Edition. New York: Macmillan
 (1988). ed. Chicago Studies in Political Economy

For comprehensiveness, see Vicky M. Longawa (1993), "George J. Stigler: A Bibliography," Journal of Political Economy, 101(5), pp. 849–862. Arrow–scrollable.

See also 

 Milton Friedman
 Regulatory capture
 Stephen Stigler, his son

Notes

References 
 Diamond, Arthur M., Jr.  (2005). "Measurement, Incentives, and Constraints in Stigler's Economics of Science." The European Journal of the History of Economic Thought 12, no. 4637–63.
 Friedman, Milton (1993). "George Stigler: A Personal Reminiscence," Journal of Political Economy 101(5), arrow-scrollable pp. 768–773.
 _ (1998). "George J. Stigler, 1911–1991. A Biographical Memoir.
 Hammond, J. Daniel, and Claire H. Hammond, ed.  (2006). Making Chicago Price Theory: Friedman–Stigler Correspondence, 1945–1957. Routledge. 165 pp. .
 Levy, David M., and Sandra J. Peart. (2008). "Stigler, George Joseph (1911–1991)." The New Palgrave Dictionary of Economics,  2nd Edition. Abstract.
 Palda, Filip (2016). A Better Kind of Violence: Chicago Political Economy, Public Choice, and the Quest for an Ultimate Theory of Power. Cooper-Wolfling Publishers. .
 
 The New Palgrave: A Dictionary of Economics (1987):
 "Stigler, George Joseph" by Peter Newman, v. 4, p. 498.
 "Stigler as an historian of economic thought" by Thomas Sowell,   v. 4, pp. 498–499.
 "Stigler's contribution to microeconomics and industrial organization," by Richard Schmalense, v. 4, pp. 499–500
 Schmalensee, Richard (1983). "George Stigler's Contributions to Economics, The Scandinavian Journal of Economics, 85(1), pp. 77–86 (arrow-scroll searchable).

External links 

 
 George Stigler's seminal studies of industrial structures, functioning of markets and causes and effects of public regulation.
 
 

1911 births
1991 deaths
American Nobel laureates
American people of German descent
American people of Hungarian descent
Historians of economic thought
20th-century American economists
Nobel laureates in Economics
National Medal of Science laureates
University of Chicago alumni
Kellogg School of Management alumni
University of Chicago faculty
Columbia University faculty
University of Washington alumni
Scientists from Seattle
Earhart Foundation Fellows
20th-century American historians
American male non-fiction writers
Fellows of the Econometric Society
Fellows of the American Statistical Association
Presidents of the American Economic Association
Distinguished Fellows of the American Economic Association
National Bureau of Economic Research
Members of the United States National Academy of Sciences
Economists from Washington (state)
Historians from Washington (state)
20th-century American male writers
American libertarians
Classical liberals
Chicago School economists
Member of the Mont Pelerin Society
Journal of Political Economy editors
Members of the American Philosophical Society